Mount Clare is an unincorporated community in Harrison County, West Virginia, United States. Mount Clare has a post office with ZIP code 26408.

History
The community was named after Mount Clare Shops in Baltimore. The Quiet Dell School is listed on the National Register of Historic Places.

References

Unincorporated communities in Harrison County, West Virginia
Unincorporated communities in West Virginia
Coal towns in West Virginia